The Official Professional Baseball Rules Book governs all aspects of the game of Major League Baseball beyond what happens on the field of play. There are a number of sources for these rules, but they all ultimately are sanctioned by the Office of the Commissioner of Baseball. Examples of these rules are the Rule 5 draft (so-named for the applicable section of the rule book) and the injured list. 
Other examples include:
 the 5/10 Rule whereby players who have been with a club for 5 consecutive years and have been a major league player for 10 years cannot be traded without their consent.
 the roster list rules (active and expanded rosters) which also determines who is eligible to play for a team in the playoffs and World Series
 tie-breaking rules for deciding which teams go to the playoffs
 implementing/enforcing the expanded playing rules issued to umpires which goes into much greater detail than the official baseball rules of play.  These rules are described in the Umpire's Manual.

Rules Book 
The Official Professional Baseball Rules Book is organized into the following sections:
Major League Constitution
Major League Rules
Professional Baseball Agreement
Basic Agreement

Major League Rules 
The below sections enumerate the numbered Major League Rules, both before and after Major League Baseball reorganized the minor leagues in advance of the 2021 season, as multiple rules were changed at that time.

As most rules do not state what the penalty is for a violation, broad discretion is granted to the Commissioner of Baseball via Rule 50, "Enforcement of Major League Rules", which specifies "action consistent with the commissioner’s powers under the Major League Constitution".

The Major League Rules begin with a note stating that whenever a provision of any of its rules conflicts with a provision in the Basic Agreement (collective bargaining agreement) negotiated with the Major League Baseball Players Association, the provision in the Basic Agreement "shall in all respects control".

2019 edition 
Source:

Circuits
Player Limits and Reserve Lists
Eligibility to Sign Contracts, Contract Terms and Contract Tenders
First Year Player Draft
Annual Selection of Players (known as the Rule 5 draft)
Selected Players
Termination of Player-Club Relation
Major League Unconditional Release
Assignment of Player Contracts
Major League Waivers
Optional Agreements
Transfer Agreements
Suspended Players
Retired Players
Restricted, Disqualified and Ineligible Lists
Reinstatement of Players
Player Salaries (governed by the Basic Agreement)
Playing Otherwise than for Club
Umpires and Official scorers
Conflicting Interests
Misconduct
a) Misconduct in Playing Baseball (throwing games)
b) Gift for Defeating Competing Club
c) Gifts to Umpires
d) Gambling
Betting on other baseball teams (1 year ineligible)
Betting on own team (permanently ineligible)
Using an illegal bookmaker (Commissioner decides penalty)
e) Violence or Misconduct (judgement of Commissioner)
f) Other Misconduct
g) No Discrimination
h) Rule to be kept posted (in English and Spanish in every clubhouse)
Claim Presentation
Holidays
Suspended Personnel
Uniform Playing Rules
a) Official Baseball Rules
b) Playing Rules Committee
c) Duties of Playing Rules Committee
d) Official Scoring Rules Committee
e) Duties of Official Scoring Rules Committee
f) Copyright and Publication
Gate Receipts
reserved
Voting
Major League Disaster Plan
Finances
Bulletins
Schedules (to be issued by commissioner)
Qualification for Post-Season Series
a) Division Champions
b) Wild Card
c) Tie-Breaking Procedures
Post-Season Series
a) Wild Card Game
b) Division Series
c) League Championship Series
d) World Series
Post-Season Supervision by the Commissioner
Pennant and Memento
Post-Season Schedule
Post-Season Series Termination
Post-Season Playing Rules (use home team's rules)
Players Eligible for Post-Season
reserved
Post-Season Expenses
Post-Season Playing Grounds
Post-Season Admissions
Division of Post-Season Receipts
Bonus Forbidden
Exhibition Games
Obligations of Participants
reserved
Enforcement of Major League Rules
Classification of Minor Leagues
Major and Minor League Territorial Rights
Minor League Expansion, Contraction, Relocation and Reclassification
Regulation of Minor League Franchises
Minor League Free Agency
Standard Player Development Contract
Travel Standards for Minor League Clubs
Standards for Minor League Playing Facilities
Lien on Territory
Definitions
a) Major League
b) Major League Club
c) Major League Player
d) Minor League Association
e) Minor League
f) Minor League Club
g) Club
h) Minor League Player
i) First-Year Player
j) Commissioner
k) President of a Minor League Association
l) Major League Reserve List
m) Minor League Reserve List
n) Major League Active List
o) Minor League Active List
p) Championship Season
q) Player Development Contract (PDC)
r) Independent Minor League Club
s) Inactive Lists
t) Winter League
u) Major League Trade Deadline

The Rules are followed by an Acceptance; "The foregoing ... have been duly accepted by the Major League Clubs and the Leagues of the National Association."

There are then Attachments to the Rules (numbers refer back to Rule # above):
3—Minor League Uniform Player Contract
12—Notice to Player of Release or Transfer
52—Major and Minor League Territories
54—Standard Minor League Financial Disclosure
56—Standard Form Letter Establishing Player Development Contract
58—Minor League Facility Standards and Compliance Inspection Procedures

2021 edition
Source:

Reserve Lists
Player Limits
Eligibility to Sign Contracts, Contract Terms and Contract Tenders
First Year Player Draft
Annual Selection of Players (known as the Rule 5 draft)
Assignment of Player Contracts
Optional Agreements
Major League Waivers
Termination of Player-Club Relation
Bulletins
Player Salaries (governed by the Basic Agreement)
Playing Otherwise than for Club
Claim Presentation
Suspended Personnel
Umpires
Official scorers
Uniform Playing Rules
a) Official Baseball Rules
b) Playing Rules Committee
c) Duties of Playing Rules Committee
d) Official Scoring Rules Committee
e) Duties of Official Scoring Rules Committee
f) Copyright and Publication
Schedules
a) Major Leagues (to be issued by commissioner)
b) Minor Leagues (per Minor League Guidelines)
Major League Disaster Plan
Conflicting Interests
Misconduct
a) Misconduct in Playing Baseball (throwing games)
b) Gift for Defeating Competing Club
c) Gifts to Umpires
d) Gambling
Betting on other baseball teams (1 year ineligible)
Betting on own team (permanently ineligible)
Using an illegal bookmaker (Commissioner decides penalty)
e) Violence or Misconduct (judgement of Commissioner)
f) Other Misconduct
g) No Discrimination
h) Rule to be kept posted (in English and Spanish in every clubhouse)
Circuits
Gate Receipts
reserved
Finances
Major and Minor League Territorial Rights
Classification of Minor Leagues
 actual content is "Standards For Minor League Playing Facilities"
reserved
reserved
reserved
reserved
reserved
Lien on Territory
Qualification for Post-Season Series
a) Division Champions
b) Wild Card
c) Tie-Breaking Procedures
Post-Season Series
a) Wild Card Game
b) Division Series
c) League Championship Series
d) World Series
Post-Season Supervision by the Commissioner
Pennant and Memento
Post-Season Schedule
Post-Season Series Termination
Post-Season Playing Rules (use home team's rules)
Players Eligible for Post-Season
Post-Season Expenses
Post-Season Playing Grounds
Post-Season Admissions
Division of Post-Season Receipts
Bonus Forbidden
Exhibition Games
Obligations of Participants
Holidays
Enforcement of Major League Rules

The Rules are followed by an Acceptance; "The foregoing ... have been duly accepted by the Major League Clubs."

There are then Attachments to the Rules (numbers refer back to Rule # above):
3—Minor League Uniform Player Contract
12—Notice to Player of Release or Transfer
26—Major and Minor League Territories

References

External links
 Home Resources Documents from the website of the SABR Business of Baseball Committee

Baseball rules
Sports business by sport
Contract law
Major League Baseball labor disputes